Václav Pech (born 3 December 1976) is a Czech professional rally driver. He has won multiple Czech Rally Championships and winner of six rallies of European Rally Championship.

IRC results

ERC results

Czech Rally Championship results

External links

IRC Official Site
Václav Pech – profile at ewrc-results.com

1976 births
Living people
Czech rally drivers
Intercontinental Rally Challenge drivers
European Rally Championship drivers
Sportspeople from Plzeň